St. Beaufort are a three-piece folk band based in Berlin. The members are Henric Hungerhoff (guitar, accordion, vocals), Joseph Jakubczyk (banjo, vocals), and Tomás Peralta González (upright bass, vocals). Their style has been referred to as being influenced by bluegrass bands mixed with contemporary folk tunes. All musicians are multi-instrumentalists.

Overview
The band formed in 2013 when American Joseph Jakubczyk arrived in Berlin and met Henric Hungerhoff, then singer-songwriter of Hungerhoff & The Wild Roots. After playing shows together in local bars, the duo found Canadian musician Derek Ullenboom, who joined as a mandolin player. St. Beaufort released a self-titled album in 2015 that gained positive reviews from Berliner Morgenpost and Folker, followed by radio appearances on national radio Deutschlandradio, Radio Eins, and Radio Fritz. The group has played numerous tours and festivals across Europe, including Y Not Festival in England, Belladrum Tartan Heart Festival in Scotland, or Fano Free Folk Festival in Denmark. After Chilean bass player Tomás Peralta González joined St. Beaufort in 2016, Derek Ullenboom left the band to focus on his performing and songwriting work with Graham Candy. Further festival appearances include Blue Balls Festivals in Switzerland, Poole Beer & Bluegrass Festival, Wilde Möhre Festival, Bergfunk Open Air, Folk am Neckar, or the Rolling Stone Weekender.

The band also hosts an acoustic session named St. Beaufort's Table. For each episode, St. Beaufort invites guest musicians to play a song together at varying locations. Guests at St. Beaufort's Table have included HONIG, Jonathan Kluth, or Charlotte Brandi of Me and My Drummer

References 

German folk music groups
Musical groups established in 2013
2013 establishments in Germany